The House of Barcelona was a medieval dynasty that ruled the County of Barcelona continuously from 878 and the Crown of Aragon from 1137 (as kings from 1162) until 1410. They descend from the Bellonids, the descendants of Wifred the Hairy. They inherited most of the Catalan counties by the thirteenth century and established a territorial Principality of Catalonia, uniting it with the Kingdom of Aragon through marriage and conquering numerous other lands and kingdoms until the death of the last legitimate male of the main branch, Martin the Humanist, in 1410. Cadet branches of the house continued to rule Urgell (since 992) and Gandia. Cadet branches of the dynasty had also ruled Ausona intermittently from 878 until 1111, Provence from 1112 to 1245, and Sicily from 1282 to 1409.  By the Compromise of Caspe of 1412 the Crown of Aragon passed to a branch of the House of Trastámara, descended from the infanta Eleanor of the house of Barcelona.

Titles of the House of Barcelona and date of acquisition
This list does not include titles held by the early Bellonids that did not remain with the family during the tenth century.
Count of Urgell (870–992)
Count of Barcelona (878–1410)
Count of Girona (878–1410)
Count of Ausona (1111–1410)
Count of Besalú (1111–1410), inherited from another branch of the family
Count of Provence (1112–1245)
Count of Berga (1118–1410)
Count of Cerdagne (1118–1410), inherited from another branch of the family
Count of Conflent (1118–1410)
Prince of Aragon (1137–1162)
King of Aragon (1162–1410)
Count of Roussillon (1172–1410)
Count of Pallars Jussà (1192–1410)
Lord of Montpellier (1204–1249)
King of Valencia (1238–1410)
King of Majorca (1276–1410)
King of Sicily (1282–1410)
King of Sardinia and Corsica (1297–1410)
Duke of Athens (1312–1388)
Count of Urgell (1314–1413)
Duke of Neopatria (1319–1390)

Family tree of the House of Barcelona

See also
Royal House of Aragon

 
Catalan nobility
Roman Catholic families

History of Catalonia